Klopjag is a South African, Afrikaans folk-rock band formed in Pretoria, Gauteng in 2002. The band's founding members were singer-songwriter and guitarist John-Henry Opperman, cellist Marie-Louise Diedericks, singer-songwriter and guitarist Salmon de Jager and singer-songwriter and guitarist Dawie de Jager. Drummer and percussionist, Werner Griesel joined the band in 2005 and Morné Bam joined the band as bassist in 2006.

History
Klopjag played their first ever show together on 13 February 2002. Their debut album 13/02 was nominated for a "Geraas" Music Award in 2003, and Musiek vir die Agtergrond was nominated for a SAMA in 2009 while they were playing major festivals like Aardklop and KKNK. The group has always been well received by music critics for their folk-rock lyrical storytelling themes. Their music videos are widespread featured on South African music channels like DStv and MK89. They have made several appearances on tv shows and movies as a band or as band members.

Band members

Current members

 John-Henry Opperman – lead vocals, backing vocals, rhythm guitar, acoustic guitar, electric guitar (2002–present)
 Marie-Louise Diedericks – lead vocals, backing vocals, cello, keyboard, violin (2002–present)
 Salmon de Jager – lead vocals, backing vocals, rhythm guitar, acoustic guitar, harmonica (2002–present)
 Dawie de Jager – lead vocals, backing vocals, rhythm guitar, acoustic guitar, electric guitar (2002–present)
 Werner Griesel – drums, percussion (2005–present)
 Morné Bam – bass (2006–present)

Former members

 Michelle Ohlhoff – bass, backing vocals, keyboard (2004–2006)
 Miles Mulder – drums, percussion (2004–2005)

Discography

Studio albums

 13/02 (2002)
 15de Laan (2004)
 Album 3 (2005)
 5 (2007)
 Musiek vir die Agtergrond (2008)

Live album

 09 (2009)

Dvds

 Aardklop (2007)
 My Storie (2011)

References

External links
 Official website
 Klopjag on Spotify
 Klopjag on Apple Music

South African musical groups